Anna Lisa Muhlach Sumilang-Martinez (March 27, 1967 – March 14, 2015), also known as Liezl Martinez was an actress in the Philippines where she was known by her screen names Liezl and Anna-Lisa.

Early life 
She was born on March 27, 1967, to superstars Amalia Fuentes (1940–2019) and Romeo Vasquez (1939–2017) in Manila, Philippines.

Personal life 
Martinez was married to Filipino actor and director Albert Martinez. They had three children: Alyanna, Alfonso and Alissa Martinez.

Health and death
Liezl was diagnosed with breast cancer in 2008 following a breast examination ordered by Dr. Judy Fuentes, her obstetrician-gynecologist at The Medical City (TMC). Liezl made a statement that she did not have any symptoms but that since her doctor said women aged 40 and above should undergo breast examinations yearly, she underwent the test.

Liezl had just recovered and "regained her crowning glory" when, in July 2011, she had had a persistent cough. She consulted with Dr. Liza Garcia, her pulmonologist at TMC, who ordered some tests that later showed that she had fluid in her lungs. When the fluids were drained from her lungs, the diagnosis confirmed that Liezl’s cancer had recurred and had metastasized to her left lung; the cancer was already in its Stage 4. “I thought I was okay and then it happened. It was much more painful and harder to accept,” Liezl said in an interview.

Throughout her battle with cancer, Liezl had the support of her husband, Albert. In a Philippine Daily Inquirer report in 2012, Albert stated that he would make sure she lived “as normal a life as possible.”

Liezl Martinez’s mother, former movie queen Amalia Fuentes, stood by her daughter's deathbed.

On March 14, 2015, Liezl's mother stated in a phone interview with the Inquirer that, after a valiant battle with her cancer, the former child star had peacefully died at 6:15 a.m. surrounded by her family. Liezl, who would have turned 48 on March 27, is survived by husband actor-director Albert Martinez and their three children, Alyanna, Alfonso and Alissa.

Legacy
Asked why she included Anna Lissa “Liezl” Muhlach Sumilang Martinez among her first batch of members of the Movie and Television Review and Classification Board (MTRCB), Sen. Grace Poe said: “She was a good mother and wife, had a firm grasp of what is right or wrong, with a strong connection and concern for the movie and TV industries, balanced by her compassion for the welfare of children.”

With the MTRCB, Liezl took charge of the “Matalinong Panonood” sorties to various parts of the country.

Liezl was designated to oversee physical improvements in the MTRCB Building, a task she relished and was meticulous to the detail.

The building's fourth floor board room was later named the Liezl S. Martinez Hall. Christening rights were held on the 25th of March, two days before what would have been her 48th birthday; in attendance were her husband, Albert; children Alfonso, Alyanna and Alissa; and Liezl's father, Romeo Vasquez; the MTRCB's chairman, Eugenio “Toto” Villareal; board members; and Liezl's office staff who loved their "Ma’am Liezl".

Filmography

References

1967 births
2015 deaths
Actresses from Manila
Filipino child actresses
Filipino film actresses
Filipino television actresses
Filipino people of Chinese descent
Filipino people of German descent
Filipino people of Spanish descent
Deaths from cancer in the Philippines
Deaths from breast cancer
Liezl
Liezl
20th-century Filipino actresses
21st-century Filipino actresses